Turakpura (Devanagari: तुर्कपुरा Turakpurá) is a village in Morar block of Gwalior district, in Madhya Pradesh, India. As of 2011, the village population is 167, in 43 households.

History 
At the beginning of the 20th century, Turakpura was part of Gwalior State. Located in the pargana and zila of Gird Gwalior, it had a population of 40 and an area of 680 bighas.

References 

Villages in Gwalior district